Jakob Talmo Tromsdal (born 8 October 1997) is a Norwegian footballer who plays for Ranheim.

References

External links
Jakob Tromsdal at NFF

1998 births
Living people
Norwegian footballers
Eliteserien players
Norwegian First Division players
Norwegian Second Division players
Ranheim Fotball players
Association football midfielders
IL Stjørdals-Blink players